Chah Khani (also Romanized as Chāh Khānī) is a village in Ziarat Rural District, in the Central District of Dashtestan County, Bushehr Province, Iran. At the 2006 census, its population was 1,487, in 333 families.

References 

Populated places in Dashtestan County